Captain Raja Virendra Shah Judeo Bahadur (1915-1971) was an Indian politician. A member of the Uttar Pradesh Praja Party, he was elected to the First and Second Vidhan Sabha of Uttar Pradesh And Married to Ranisab roop ju raja daughter of HH Sir Lokendra Maharaj Govind Singh Judeo Datia State. He was also raja of Jagamanpur, Jalaun District, Uttar Pradesh.

He graduated from Colvin Taluqdars' College and Mayo College. His father was Raja Lokendra Shah of Jagamanpur.

References 

1915 births
1971 deaths
People from Jalaun district
20th-century Indian politicians